Silicon Valley of China may refer to:

Shenzhen, particularly its Nanshan District
 Zhongguancun, a technology hub in Haidian District, Beijing